Blood Knight may refer to:

 The Blood Knight, a fantasy novel by Greg Keyes in "The Kingdoms of Thorn and Bone" series
 a unit of Vampire Counts in the Warhammer fantasy universe
 a group of guard tamers in the Digimon World series, see List of characters in the Digimon World series
 an order of blood elf Paladins residing in Silvermoon City in the fantasy MMORPG World of Warcraft